The Beechwoods nature reserve is managed by the Wildlife Trust for Bedfordshire, Cambridgeshire, Northamptonshire and Peterborough. It is located in Cambridge, England, between its center and the Gog Magog Hills.

References 

Nature reserves in Cambridgeshire
Wildlife Trust for Bedfordshire, Cambridgeshire and Northamptonshire reserves